Autosticha taiwana is a moth in the family Autostichidae. It was described by Kyu-Tek Park and Chun-Sheng Wu in 2003. It is found in Taiwan.

The wingspan is 17–18 mm. The forewings are pale brownish orange, speckled with dark fuscous scales, more densely beyond the middle. The costa is almost straight and the first stigma is found at the middle of the cell, the plical below the first and the third at the end of the cell. There are three to four marginal dots on the apical one-fourth of the costa and five to six dots along the termen. The hindwings are pale grey.

Etymology
The species name is derived from the type location.

References

Moths described in 2003
Autosticha
Moths of Taiwan